Les Sille (12 April 1928 – 	7 April 2007) was an English footballer, who played as a winger in the Football League for Tranmere Rovers.

References

Tranmere Rovers F.C. players
Crystal Palace F.C. players
Association football wingers
English Football League players
AFC Bournemouth players
1928 births
2007 deaths
Footballers from Liverpool
English footballers